Peter Harding may refer to:

 Sir Peter Harding (RAF officer, born 1933) (born 1933), retired Royal Air Force Chief of the Air Staff, and Chief of Defence Staff
 Peter Harding (RAF officer, born 1940) (1940–2013), air vice-marshal
 Peter Harding (metallurgist) (1919–2006), RAF reconnaissance pilot, World War II prisoner of war and metallurgist at the Royal School of Mines
 Peter Harding (wheelchair rugby) (born 1969), Australian Paralympic wheelchair rugby union player
 Peter Harding (climber) (1924–2007), British rock climber 
Pete Harding, 2003 NASCAR Craftsman Truck Series